Pedro Miguel Gaspar Amaral (born 25 August 1997) is a Portuguese professional footballer who plays for Saudi Arabian club Khaleej FC as a left-back.

Club career

Benfica
Born in Sintra, Lisbon District, Amaral joined S.L. Benfica's youth system at the age of 10. He made his professional debut for the reserve team on 11 September 2016, as a 60th-minute substitute in a 2–1 home win against Académico de Viseu F.C. in the LigaPro where he featured as a right-back.

Amaral scored his first goal in the second division on 8 August 2017, but in a 2–1 away loss to U.D. Oliveirense. In January 2019, he signed for Super League Greece club Panetolikos F.C. on a six-month loan deal with an option for an additional year.

Rio Ave
On 4 July 2019, Amaral joined Rio Ave F.C. on a five-year contract. His Primeira Liga bow took place on 25 October, in a goalless draw at F.C. Paços de Ferreira.

Amaral contributed 28 appearances in the 2021–22 season, as his team returned from the Liga Portugal 2 as champions. He scored his first goal in the top flight on 28 August 2022, in the 3–1 home victory over title holders FC Porto.

Khaleej
On 19 January 2023, Amaral agreed to a five-month deal at Saudi Professional League side Khaleej FC.

International career
Amaral won his first cap for the Portugal under-21 side on 5 September 2017, in a 2–0 home win against Wales in the 2019 UEFA European Championship qualifiers where he was also booked.

Honours
Rio Ave
Liga Portugal 2: 2021–22

References

External links

1997 births
Living people
People from Sintra
Sportspeople from Lisbon District
Portuguese footballers
Association football defenders
Primeira Liga players
Liga Portugal 2 players
Casa Pia A.C. players
S.L. Benfica B players
Rio Ave F.C. players
Super League Greece players
Panetolikos F.C. players
Saudi Professional League players
Khaleej FC players
Portugal youth international footballers
Portugal under-21 international footballers
Portuguese expatriate footballers
Expatriate footballers in Greece
Expatriate footballers in Saudi Arabia
Portuguese expatriate sportspeople in Greece
Portuguese expatriate sportspeople in Saudi Arabia